The Naga languages are a geographic and ethnic grouping of languages under the Kuki-Chin-Naga languages, spoken mostly by Naga peoples.

Northern Naga languages do not fall within the group, in spite of being spoken by Naga groups; instead, these form part of the Sal languages within Sino-Tibetan, while Southern Naga languages form a branch within Kuki-Chin languages subfamily.

Classification

Angami-Ao

Angami-Pochuri 

The Angami-Pochuri languages:
Angami:
Angami
Chokri (Chakri, Chakhesang) 
Kheza (Chakhesang) 
Mao (Sopvoma)
Poula (Poumai)
Pochuri:
Pochuri
Ntenyi (Northern Rengma)
Rengma
Sümi (Sema)

Central Naga (Ao) 

The Central Naga languages:
Ao language
Chungli Ao
Mongsen Ao
Changki
Dordar (Yacham)
Longla
Lotha (Lhota)
Sangtam ('Thukumi')
Kizare
Pirr (Northern Sangtam)
Phelongre
Thukumi (Central Sangtam)
Photsimi
Purr (Southern Sangtam)
Yimchingric
Yimkhiungrü ('Yachumi')
Tikhir
Chirr
Phanungru
Langa
Para
Makuric
Makury
Long Phuri

Koki is a "Naga" language spoken in and around Leshi Township, Myanmar that could possibly classify as Tangkhulic languages or Ao languages.

Tangkhul-Maring 

The Tangkhul-Maring languages:
Tangkhulic
Tangkhul 
Somra 
Akyaung Ari
Kachai
Huishu
Tusom
Maringic
Khoibu
Maring

Western Naga (Zemeic) 

The Western Naga (Zemeic) languages:
Zeme proper
Mzieme (Northern Zeme)
Liangmai
Rongmei
Inpui (Puiron)
Khoirao (Thangal)
Maram

See also 
 Northern Naga languages
 Zakhring language  
 Nagamese Creole

References 

Naga people